West Nusa Tenggara State Museum (Indonesian Museum Negeri Nusa Tenggara Barat) is a state museum located in Mataram, Lombok Island, Indonesia. The museum is the provincial museum of the West Nusa Tenggara province.

The museum collects 7,387 items (2006) related to Lombok and Sumbawa traditional arts (e.g. traditional kris, songket, basketware and masks) as well related subject such as geology, archaeology, architecture, biology, ceramic, paintings, and others.

Collection
Some of the museum's collection are wedding costumes of the Sasak, Samawa, and Mbojo ethnic groups, several fossils, colonial coins from the Portuguese, Spanish, and Dutch, and traditional weapon from the Bima Sultanate of Mataram.

The museum also collects traditional items related to mysticism such as divining stones, and traditional items to ward off bad luck, lightning, weakness, and so on.

See also 
List of museums and cultural institutions in Indonesia

References 

Museums in Indonesia
Museums established in 1982
Tourist attractions in West Nusa Tenggara
Buildings and structures in West Nusa Tenggara
1982 establishments in Indonesia